The 2004 Nationwide Tour season ran from February 5 to October 31. The season consisted of 31 official money golf tournaments; five of which were played outside of the United States. The top 20 players on the year-end money list earned their PGA Tour card for 2005.

Schedule
The following table lists official events during the 2004 season.

Money leaders
For full rankings, see 2004 Nationwide Tour graduates.

The money list was based on prize money won during the season, calculated in U.S. dollars. The top 20 players on the tour earned status to play on the 2005 PGA Tour.

Awards

See also
2004 Nationwide Tour graduates

Notes

References

External links
Schedule

Korn Ferry Tour seasons
Nationwide Tour